The 1886 Home Nations Championship was the fourth series of the rugby union Home Nations Championship. Five matches were played between 2 January and 13 March 1886. It was contested by England, Ireland, Scotland, and Wales. The 1886 Championship was shared by England and Scotland who both won two matches each.

Table

Results

Scoring system
The matches for this season were decided on goals scored. A goal was awarded for a successful conversion after a try, for a dropped goal or for a goal from mark. If a game was drawn, any unconverted tries were tallied to give a winner. If there was still no clear winner, the match was declared a draw.

The matches

England vs. Wales

England: AS Taylor (Blackheath), CG Wade (Richmond), AR Robertshaw (Bradford), Andrew Stoddart (Blackheath), A Rotherham (Richmond), F Bonsor (Bradford), Charles Gurdon (Richmond), WG Clibbon (Richmond), CJB Marriott (Blackheath) capt., GL Jeffery (Blackheath), RE Inglis (Blackheath), Froude Hancock (Blackheath), E Wilkinson (Bradford), Frank Moss (Broughton), CH Elliot (Sunderland)

Wales: Harry Bowen (Llanelli), Charles Taylor (Ruabon), Arthur Gould (Newport), Billy Douglas (Cardiff), Charlie Newman (Newport) capt., William Stadden (Cardiff), Frank Hill (Cardiff), Dai Lewis (Cardiff), George Avery Young (Cardiff), William Bowen (Swansea), D Morgan (Swansea), Edward Alexander (Cambridge Uni.), Bob Gould (Newport), Willie Thomas (Llandovery), Evan Roberts (Llanelli)

Wales vs. Scotland

Wales: Harry Bowen (Llanelli), Charles Taylor (Blackheath), Arthur Gould (Newport), Frank Hancock (Cardiff) capt., Billy Douglas (Cardiff), Alfred Augustus Mathews (Lampeter), William Stadden (Cardiff), Frank Hill (Cardiff), Dai Lewis (Cardiff), George Avery Young (Cardiff), William Bowen (Swansea), D Morgan (Swansea), Edward Alexander (Cambridge Uni.), Tom Clapp (Newport), Willie Thomas (Llandovery)

Scotland: F McIndie (Glasgow Acads), WF Holmes (London Scottish), DJ Macfarlan (RIE College), RH Morrison (Edinburgh University), Andrew Ramsay Don-Wauchope (Fettesian-Lorettonians), PH Don Wauchope (Fettesian-Lorettonians),  JB Brown (Glasgow Acads) capt., AT Clay (Edinburgh Acads), J French (Glasgow Acads), TW Irvine (Edinburgh Acads), WM Macleod  (Edinburgh Wanderers), CJB Milne (West of Scotland), C Reid (Edinburgh Acads), J Tod (Watsonians), WA Walls (Glasgow Acads)

Ireland vs. England

Ireland: JWR Morrow (Queen's College, Belfast), EH Greene (Dublin Uni.), JP Ross (Lansdowne), RG Warren (Lansdowne), DJ Ross (Belfast Acads), M Johnston (Wanderers) capt., Victor Le Fanu (Cambridge University), Thomas Lyle (Dublin Uni.), HB Brabazon (Dublin Uni.), T Shanahan (Lansdowne), RW Hughes (NIFC), R. H. Massy-Westropp (Limerick), J Chambers (Dublin Uni.), J Johnston (Belfast Acads), WG Rutherford (Tipperary)

England: AS Taylor (Blackheath), CG Wade (Richmond), AR Robertshaw (Bradford), Andrew Stoddart (Blackheath), A Rotherham (Richmond), F Bonsor (Bradford), Charles Gurdon (Richmond), WG Clibbon (Richmond), CJB Marriott (Blackheath) capt., GL Jeffery (Blackheath), RE Inglis (Blackheath), Froude Hancock (Blackheath), E Wilkinson (Bradford), N Spurling (Blackheath), A Teggin (Broughton Rangers)

Scotland vs. Ireland

Scotland: F McIndie (Glasgow Acads), AE Stephens (West of Scotland), DJ Macfarlan (RIE College), RH Morrison (Edinburgh University), Andrew Ramsay Don-Wauchope (Fettesian-Lorettonians), AGG Asher (Edinburgh Wanderers),  JB Brown (Glasgow Acads) capt., AT Clay (Edinburgh Acads), DA Macleod (Glasgow Uni.), TW Irvine (Edinburgh Acads), WM Macleod  (Edinburgh Wanderers), CJB Milne (West of Scotland), C Reid (Edinburgh Acads), J Tod (Watsonians), WA Walls (Glasgow Acads)

Ireland: JWR Morrow (Queen's College, Belfast), Maxwell Carpendale (Monkstown), JP Ross (Lansdowne) capt., RW Herrick (Dublin Uni.), JF Ross (NIFC), M Johnston (Wanderers), Victor Le Fanu (Cambridge University), J McMordie (Queen's College, Belfast), FH Miller (Wanderers), FW Moore (Wanderers), R Nelson (Queen's College, Belfast), FO Stoker (Wanderers), J Chambers (Dublin Uni.), J Waites (Bective Rangers), HJ Neill (NIFC)

Scotland vs. England

Scotland: JP Veitch (Royal HSFP),  WF Holmes (RIE College), GR Wilson (Royal HSFP), RH Morrison (Edinburgh University), Andrew Ramsay Don-Wauchope (Fettesian-Lorettonians), AGG Asher (Edinburgh Wanderers),  JB Brown (Glasgow Acads) capt., AT Clay (Edinburgh Acads), DA Macleod (Glasgow Uni.), TW Irvine (Edinburgh Acads), WC McEwan  (Edinburgh Acads), CJB Milne (West of Scotland), C Reid (Edinburgh Acads), J Tod (Watsonians), WA Walls (Glasgow Acads)

England: CH Sample (Cambridge Uni.), Ernest Brutton (Cambridge Uni.), AR Robertshaw (Bradford), Andrew Stoddart (Blackheath), A Rotherham (Richmond), F Bonsor (Bradford), Charles Gurdon (Richmond), WG Clibbon (Richmond), CJB Marriott (Blackheath), GL Jeffery (Blackheath), RE Inglis (Blackheath), ET Gurdon (Richmond) capt., E Wilkinson (Bradford), N Spurling (Blackheath), A Teggin (Broughton Rangers)

External links

1886
1885–86 in British rugby union
1885–86 in English rugby union
rugby union
rugby union
1885–86 in Scottish rugby union